X300 may refer to:

AMD X300 platform, a system on a chip solution for AMD Ryzen processors
Dell Latitude X300
ThinkPad X300
Toshiba Qosmio X300
Radeon X300
Jaguar XJ (X300)